Elections were held in the Northern Mindanao for seats in the House of Representatives of the Philippines on May 13, 2013.

The candidate with the most votes won that district's seat for the 16th Congress of the Philippines.

Summary

Bukidnon
Bukidnon was redistricted into four districts after the candidacies were submitted. As a result, the Commission on Elections (Philippines) will take into account the places where the nominees are registered to determine on what district they are running under.

1st District
Jesus Emmanuel Paras is the incumbent.

2nd District
Incumbent Florencio Flores is running unopposed.

3rd District
Incumbent from the predistricted third district Jose Ma. Zubiri III found himself running at the redistricted 3rd district. His Bukidnon Paglaum party is in an electoral alliance with the Liberal Party.

4th District
The seat for the redistricted 4th District is open.

Cagayan de Oro

1st District
Jose Benjamin Benaldo is the incumbent.

2nd District
Rufus Rodriguez is the incumbent.

Camiguin
Incumbent Pedro Romualdo's opponent is former member of parliament Homobono Adaza. However, Romualdo died on April 23, 2013. His grandson Xavier who is one of the top 10 in 2012 bar exam as his replacement candidate.

Lanao del Norte

1st District
Imelda Dimaporo is the incumbent.

2nd District
Incumbent Fatimah Aliah Dimaporo is not running. Former Representative. Abdullah Dimaporo is her party's nominee.

Iligan
Vicente Belmonte, Jr. is incumbent.

Misamis Occidental

1st District
Jorge Almonte is the incumbent.

2nd District
Loreto Leo Ocampos is the incumbent.

Misamis Oriental

1st District
Peter Unabia is the incumbent.

2nd District
Incumbent Yevgeny Vincent Emano opted not to run again for a 3rd and final term. Instead, he is running for governorship. Augusto H. Baculio is his party's nominee.

References

2013 Philippine general election
Lower house elections in Northern Mindanao